Eta Reticuli, Latinized from η Reticuli, is a solitary star in the southern constellation of Reticulum. With an apparent visual magnitude of 5.22, it is faintly visible to the naked eye on a dark night. Based upon an annual parallax shift of 8.48 mas, it is located at a distance of roughly 385 light years from the Sun. It may be a member of the high-velocity Zeta Herculis Moving Group of stars that share a common motion through space.

This is an evolved G-type giant star with a stellar classification of G7 III. Based upon stellar models, it has an estimated 2.54 times the mass of the Sun and 13.24 times the Sun's radius. With an age of around 1.17 billion years, it is radiating 120 times the solar luminosity from its outer atmosphere at an effective temperature of 4,948 K.

Eta Reticuli is moving through the Galaxy at a speed of 117.6 km/s relative to the Sun. Its projected Galactic orbit carries it between 11,700 and 31,600 light years from the center of the Galaxy.

References

G-type giants
Zeta Herculis Moving Group
Reticulum (constellation)
Reticuli, Eta
Durchmusterung objects
028093
020384
1395